Amorphous silica-alumina is a synthetic substance that is used as a catalyst or catalyst support. It can be prepared in a number of ways for example:
 Precipitation of hydrous alumina onto amorphous silica hydrogel
 Reacting a silica sol with an alumina sol
 Coprecipitation from sodium silicate / aluminium salt solution
Water-soluble contaminants, e.g. sodium salts, are removed by washing.
Some of the alumina is present in tetrahedral coordination as shown by NMR studies  29Si MASNMR and 27Al NMR
Amorphous silica-alumina contains sites which are termed Brønsted acid (or protic) sites, with an ionizable hydrogen atom, and Lewis acid (aprotic), electron accepting sites and these different types of acidic site can be distinguished by the ways in which, say, pyridine attaches. On Lewis acid sites it forms complexes and on the Brønsted sites it adsorbs as the pyridinium ion.

As of 2000 examples of processes that use silica-alumina catalysts are the production of pyridine from crotonaldehyde, formaldehyde, steam, air and ammonia and the cracking of hydrocarbons,

References

Catalysis
Inorganic silicon compounds
Acid catalysts